Tridimeris is a genus of flowering plants belonging to the family Annonaceae.

Its native range is Mexico.

Species:
 Tridimeris chiapensis M.A.Escobar & Ortíz-Rodr. 
 Tridimeris hahniana Baill.

References

Annonaceae
Annonaceae genera